Seize the day is a traditional translation of the Latin phrase carpe diem ("enjoy the day", literally "pluck (or harvest) the day").

Seize the Day may also refer to:

Music
 Seize the Day (band), a folk band from the United Kingdom
 Seize the Day (album), a 2003 album by Damien Dempsey
"Seize the Day", a song from the 1992 Broadway musical Newsies
 "Seize the Day" (song), a song by Avenged Sevenfold from the 2005 album City of Evil by Avenged Sevenfold
 "Seize the Day", a song by Wax Tailor (featuring Charlotte Savary) appearing in the 2008 film Paris
 "Seize the Day", a song from Paul McCartney's 2020 album McCartney III

Other uses
 Seize the Day (film), a 1986 film starring Robin Williams
 Seize the Day Inc., a privately held company in Las Vegas, Nevada
 Seize the Day (novel), a 1956 novel by Saul Bellow

See also 
 Carpe diem (disambiguation)
 Seize the Night (novel), a 1998 novel by Dean Koontz